Mursili II (also spelled Mursilis II) was a king of the Hittite Empire (New kingdom) c. 1330–1295 BC (middle chronology) or 1321–1295 BC (short chronology).

King of the Hittites

Mursili was the third born son of King Suppiluliuma I, one of the most powerful men to rule over the Hittite Empire,  and Queen Henti. He was the younger brother of Arnuwanda II, he also had a sister and one more brother.

Mursili assumed the Hittite throne after the premature death of Arnuwanda II who, like their father, fell victim to the plague which ravaged the Hatti in the 1330s BC. He was greeted with contempt by Hatti's enemies and faced numerous rebellions early in his reign, the most serious of which were those initiated by the Kaskas in the mountains of Anatolia, but also by the Arzawa kingdom in southwest Asia Minor and the Hayasa-Azzi confederation in the Armenian Highlands. This was because he was perceived to be an inexperienced ruler who only became king due to the early death of Arnuwanda. Mursili records the scorn of his foes in his Annals:

While Mursili was a young and inexperienced king, he was almost certainly not a child when he took the Hittite throne and must have reached an age to be capable of ruling in his own right. Had he been a child, other arrangements would have been made to secure the stability of the Empire; Mursili after all had two surviving elder brothers who served as the viceroys of Carchemish (i.e.: Sarri-Kush) and Aleppo respectively.

Mursili II would prove to be more than a match for his successful father, in his military deeds and diplomacy. The Annals for the first ten years of his reign have survived and record that he carried out punitive campaigns against the Kaska tribes in the first two years of his reign in order to secure his kingdom's northern borders. The king then turned to the West to resist the aggression of Uhhaziti, king of Arzawa, who was attempting to lure away Hittite allies into his camp. During his ninth year his cupbearer Nuvanza decisively defeated Hayasan forces at the Battle of Ganuvara, after which the Hayasa-Azzi would be reduced to Hittite vassals. The Annals also reveal that an "omen of the sun," or solar eclipse, occurred in his tenth year as king, just as he was about to launch his campaign against the Kaska peoples.

While Mursili II's highest confirmed date was his twenty-second year, he is believed to have lived beyond this date for a few more years and died after a reign of around 25 to 27 years. He was succeeded by his son Muwatalli II.

The eclipse

Mursili's Year 10 solar eclipse is of great importance for the dating of the Hittite Empire within the chronology of the Ancient Near East. There are only two possible dates for the eclipse: 24 June 1312 BC or 13 April 1308 BC. The earlier date is accepted by Hittitologists such as Trevor R. Bryce (1998), while Paul Åström (1993) has suggested the later date. However, most scholars accept the 1312 BC event because this eclipse's effects would have been particularly dramatic with a near total eclipse over the Peloponnese region and Anatolia (where Mursili II was campaigning) around noon. In contrast, the 1308 BC astronomical event began in Arabia and then travelled eastwards in a northeasterly direction; it only reached its maximum impact over Mongolia and Central Asia. It occurred over Anatolia around 8:20 in the morning making it less noticeable.

Family
Mursili is known to have had several children with his first wife Gassulawiya including three sons named Muwatalli, Hattusili III and Halpasulupi. A daughter named Massanauzzi (referred to as Matanaza in correspondence with the Egyptian king Ramesses II) was married to Masturi, a ruler of a vassal state. Mursili had further sons with a second wife named Tanuhepa. The names of the sons of this second wife have not been recorded however.

Through his son Muwatalli he had a grandson who also ruled the kingdom, Mursili III, Queen Maathorneferure and Tudhaliya IV were also grandchildren of Mursili II.

See also

 History of the Hittites

In fiction
 Janet Morris wrote a detailed biographical novel, I, the Sun, whose subject was Suppiluliuma I. Mursili II is an important figure in this novel, in which all characters are from the historical record, which Dr. Jerry Pournelle called "a masterpiece of historical fiction" and about which O.M. Gurney, Hittite scholar and author of The Hittites, commented that "the author is familiar with every aspect of Hittite culture". Morris' book was republished by The Perseid Press in April 2013.
 Chie Shinohara wrote the manga series Red River (also known as Anatolia Story), about a fifteen-year-old Japanese girl named Yuri Suzuki, who is magically transported to Hattusa, the capital of the Hittite Empire in Anatolia. She was summoned by Queen Nakia who means to use Yuri as a human sacrifice. Yuri's blood is the key element needed in placing a curse upon the princes of the land so that they will perish, leaving Nakia's son Juda as the sole heir to the throne. As the story progresses, however, Yuri not only repeatedly manages to escape Nakia's scheming, she also becomes revered as an incarnation of the goddess Ishtar and falls in love with prince Kail. Mursili II is portrayed as Prince Kail Mursili. In the end, Yuri decides to stay in the past, and after Juda renounces his claim out of disgust towards his mother, Kail and Yuri ascend as the rulers of Hattusa. 
 Mursili II is a major figure in all three books of the Amarna Trilogy by Grea Alexander. In the series, Mursili becomes obsessed with appeasing the gods and regaining their favor after his father's betrayal of the Telepenus's Proclamation and the disasters that befall the Hittites following the so-called Zannanza affair.
 Mursili II is an important presence in Gordon Doherty's novel, Empires of Bronze: Son of Ishtar (2019), whose protagonist is Mursili's third son, Hattusilis III.

References

Sources

External links

1290s BC deaths
Hittite kings
14th-century BC rulers
Year of birth unknown